Yanda Dogon is a Dogon language spoken in Mali. It is reported to be lexically similar to Nanga, which is only known from one report from 1953.

References

Sources
 .

External links
Yanda wordlist (Dendo and Blench, 2005)

Dogon languages
Languages of Mali